Halilpaşa is a neighbourhood in the İspir District of Erzurum Province in Turkey

References

Villages in İspir District